Mirza Jawan Bakht (1841 – 18 September 1884) was the son of Emperor Bahadur Shah Zafar and Zeenat Mahal. He was the fifteenth son of his father, but the only son of his mother. She nursed the ambition of placing him on the Mughal throne.

Biography
His mother, Zeenat Mahal, saved him all through 1857 rebellion and kept him in safe custody. She began promoting her son as heir to the throne over the Emperor's remaining eldest son Mirza Fath-ul-Mulk Bahadur. But due to the primogeniture policy of the British, this was not accepted. 

On 2 April 1852, at the age of eleven, he was married in a grand ceremony in Delhi to Nawab Shah Zamani Begum, his mother's niece. His mother planned his lavish 10-day wedding to elevate his stature for the throne. His wife, Shah Zamani Begum died in July 1899.

After the death of his imperial father in Rangoon, he was buried there. Jawan Bakht and his teacher Hafiz Mohammed Ibrahim Dehlavi arranged the funeral prayers and burial.

Issue

Mirza Jawan Bahkt's first child born was a stillborn son in 1859. His second child was named Jamshed Bakht. Jamshed had two sons, Bedar Bakht, died in 1980 and Sikandar Bakht, died in 1986.

References

Mughal princes
19th-century Indian people
People from Delhi